Billy Howat is a Scottish curler.

At the national level, he is a 1985 Scottish men's champion curler.

In 2015–2016 he was president of the Royal Caledonian Curling Club (Scottish Curling Association). Some years before it he was president of the Ayr Curling Club.

Teams

References

External links

 
 
 
 
 
Video:  (part of opening ceremony)

Living people
Scottish male curlers
Scottish curling champions
Date of birth missing (living people)
Place of birth missing (living people)
Year of birth missing (living people)